Md. Touhid Hossain (born 1 February 1955) is a former Foreign Secretary of Bangladesh. He is the former High Commissioner of Bangladesh to South Africa.

Early life 
Hossain was born on 1 February 1955. He completed his master's degree in history from the University of Dhaka.

Career 
Hossain joined the Bangladesh Foreign Service in 1981.

From January 1999 to February 2000, Hossain served as the Principal of the Foreign Service Academy.

Hossain was the Deputy High Commissioner of Bangladesh in Kolkata from 2001 to 2005. He attended the 6th International Shillong Trade Fair and refuted Indian allegations of illegal migrants in the North East India. He blamed India's lack of willingness for the lack of development in Bangladesh-India relations.

From 17 December 2006 to 8 July 2009, Hossain was the Foreign Secretary of Bangladesh. From 29 to 30 August he hosted a delegation led by his counterpart in Pakistan, Riaz Mohammad Khan.

From July 2009 to July 2012, Hossain served as the Principal of the Foreign Service Academy. In June 2012, Hossain was appointed the High Commissioner of Bangladesh to South Africa. He blamed the death of Bangladeshi expats in South Africa on a lack of law and order. In September 2012, the Bangladesh High commission in South Africa was robbed and in March 2013 the ambassadors residence was robbed and Hossain's wife was held at gunpoint.

Hossain was the chief guest at the Bangladesh University of Professionals International Model United Nations in September 2019.

Hossain was the keynote speaker in March 2021 conference on Bangladesh turning 50 organized by Bangladesh Institute of Law and International Affairs. In September 2021, Hossain was a guest presented at a seminar on disinformation and reporting for Bangladeshi journalists organized by the United States Agency for International Development.

References 

Bangladeshi diplomats
Foreign Secretaries of Bangladesh
University of Dhaka alumni
High Commissioners of Bangladesh to South Africa
1955 births
Living people